Martinsville is an unincorporated community in Nacogdoches County, Texas, United States.

The Martinsville Independent School District serves area students.

References 

Unincorporated communities in Nacogdoches County, Texas
Unincorporated communities in Texas